Distorted may refer to:
 Anything subject to distortion
 Distorted (band), a progressive deathdoom metal band from Bat-Yam, Israel
 Distorted (EP), an extended play by the band Distorted
 Distorted (film), a 2018 Canadian thriller
 Distorted Music Festival, a 2005 Australian music festival
 Distorted (TV series), a 2017 South Korean television series
 Distorted, a 2001 demo album by Biomechanical
 Beatmania IIDX 13: Distorted, an arcade game

See also
 Distort (disambiguation)
 Distortion (disambiguation)